Agrotis bigramma, the great dart, is a moth of the family Noctuidae. The species was first described by Eugenius Johann Christoph Esper in 1790. It is found from along the southern shores of the Baltic Sea to China, the Levant and North Africa. Migrants have been reported as far west as Great Britain with three in one trap at St Agnes, Isles of Scilly on 10 August 1997.

The wingspan is 40–48 mm. Adults are on wing from September to December. There is one generation per year.

The larvae feed on the roots of Poaceae species and other low growing herbaceous plants.

References

External links
 
 Great Dart at UKMoths
 Lepiforum e.V.

Agrotis
Moths described in 1790
Moths of Africa
Moths of Asia
Moths of Europe
Moths of the Middle East
Taxa named by Eugenius Johann Christoph Esper